Homestead Senior High School, in Fort Wayne, United States, is a public four-year high school. Part of Southwest Allen County Schools, the school receives accreditation from the Indiana Department of Education and the North Central Association of Colleges and Secondary Schools.

Activities

Media program

Homestead Media is the school's student-run, not-for-profit and award-winning Digital Media Program. The school has Television, Radio and Sports Broadcasting programs that help make up the Homestead Media department.

The TV/video department has a YouTube channel dedicated to its award-winning weekly school news program, HHS In Depth, that has been publishing on its YouTube channel since 2013. In 2017, Intercollegiate Broadcasting System named HHS In Depth the nation's best school nescast. 

The 'live' video department broadcasts Homestead sports and performing arts events live on Homestead Live via the same YouTube channel. Homestead Live covers all home football and basketball (boys and girls) games, along with other sports and perf arts associated with the school.

Homestead won “High School TV Station of the Year” at Indiana Association of School Broadcasters (IASB) in 2020, 2021 and 2022.

WCYT is the school's student-run, not-for-profit radio station. It has been broadcasting in the city of Fort Wayne since 1995. It features indie-rock music on a 24/7, 365 day basis, along with occasional talk shows. WCYT has won "High School Radio Station of the Year" in 2017, 2018, 2019 and 2021 at IASB.

Performing arts

The Homestead Spartan Alliance Band is Homestead's marching band. The band in recent years has been among the best in the state of Indiana and in the United States, with 6 state titles and numerous appearances in the Bands of America Grand National Championship.

Publications
The Spartana, Homestead's student newspaper, was awarded the NSPA Pacemaker award for its 2004-2005 and 2008-2009 volumes.

Sports

Homestead has a variety of sports teams and clubs. Homestead's varsity teams compete in the largest class in the state of Indiana. The school belongs to the Summit Athletic Conference for Football and Boys and Girls Basketball but has no conference affiliate for all other sports teams. Their previous conference the Northeast Hoosier Conference disbanded in 2015. Homestead's biggest rival and fellow member of the SAC is the Chargers of Carroll High School.

There are currently 23 Varsity-level sports team (11 boys' sports, 10 girls' sports and two Unified sports teams) at the high school. These sports are sanctioned by the Indiana High School Athletic Association and all teams are eligible to participate in the state of Indiana's championship tournaments.

Postseason success
 The gymnastics team won the state championship in 1983, 1984, 1985, 1996, 1999 and 2001.
 The boys' basketball team won the state championship in 2015 (4A).
 The girls’ basketball team won the state championship in 2017 (4A). As well as finished as a runner up in 2015 losing out to Columbus North High School(4A).
 The girls’ golf team won the state championship in 2019.
 The girls’ soccer team won the state championship in 2021 (3A).

Notable alumni
 Rob Bowen, catcher, former Major League Baseball player
 Susan Brooks, member of the U.S. House of Representatives from Indiana's 5th district
 Ben Skowronek, current NFL wide receiver, Super Bowl 56 Champion Los Angeles Rams
 Caleb Swanigan, former NBA basketball player for Portland Trail Blazers and Sacramento Kings, All-American basketball player at Purdue Boilermakers and TLC celebrity
 Zach Terrell, former college football player, Western Michigan University

External links
 
 Article on indianafind.com
 Homestead Media Channel
 Homestead High School's Radio Station - 91.1 FM
 Homestead Spartan Alliance Band's Official Website

See also
 List of high schools in Indiana

References

Public high schools in Indiana
Schools in Fort Wayne, Indiana
Educational institutions established in 1970
1970 establishments in Indiana